Meyer Turku Oy is a Finnish shipbuilding company located in Turku, Finland Proper. The company is fully owned by German shipbuilder Meyer Werft GmbH. The main products are cruise ships and cruiseferries.

The shipbuilding facility is Perno shipyard in Turku. The yard area is 144 hectares and it is equipped with a 365-metre-long dry dock and two bridge cranes with capacities of 600 and 1,200 tonnes. Additionally, the company owns subsidiaries Shipbuilding Completion Oy, Rauma-based ENG'nD Oy and Piikkiö-located cabin builder Piikkio Works Oy.

The company was founded in November 1989 under name Masa-Yards Oy to continue operations of the previously bankrupted Wärtsilä Marine. The heritage, however, goes back to 1737 when industrial shipbuilding was first started in Turku.

Company 
Meyer Turku Oy is fully owned by Germany-based Meyer Werft GmbH.

Perno shipyard 

The main facility is Turku shipyard that is situated in Perno, Turku. The yard area is 144 hectares and it is equipped with a dry dock that is 365 metres long, 80 metres wide and 10 metres deep. The main crane is a bridge crane with 600 tonnes capacity.

Piikkio Works 
Ship cabins are built in a separate factory in Piikkiö, Kaarina under subsidiary Piikkio Works Oy. The company employs 134 people and its turnover is €38.9 million (2014).

Shipbuilding Completion 
Shipbuilding Completion designs and builds ship interior outfitting and operates in Perno shipyard premises. The company turnover is €13.3 million and it employs 16 people (2014).

ENG'nD 
ENG'nD is an engineering company that is specialised on piping and electrical wiring system design. The company is based in Rauma and its turnover is €2.7 million.

History

Heritage 
History of industrial shipbuilding in Turku goes back to 1737, when the Swedish king gave to Turku merchants Esaias Wechter and Henric Rungeen a licence for shipbuilding next to river Aura. They recruited Scottish master shipbuilder Robert Fithie to lead the shipbuilding projects. After Wechter and Rungeen discontinued shipbuilding, Fithie founded a new company which later became known as Turku Old Shipyard.
The company was taken over by William Crichton who incorporated it into his own company W:m Crichton & C:o in 1882. The main customer was Imperial Russian Navy which ordered a number of torpedo boats and other vessels. Crichton's company bankrupted in 1913, after which local businessmen Ernst and Magnus Dahlström founded Ab Crichton to continue shipbuilding. As all the Finnish shipbuilders, Ab Crichton suffered of low order intake at the early 1920s; it merged with its competitor and neighbour Ab Vulcan in 1924. The new company name became Ab Crichton-Vulcan Oy and its manager became Allan Staffans. It got large orders from the Finnish Navy, most significant ones being coastal defence ships Väinämöinen and Ilmarinen. By time Crichton-Vulcan grew the biggest shipbuilding company of Finland. The major owner became Helsinki-based Kone- ja Siltarakennus which also owned the Hietalahti shipyard. In 1935 Kone- ja Siltarakennus was taken over by Karelian iron mill Wärtsilä which was led by energetic Wilhelm Wahlforss. Most of the ships produced by Wärtsilä Crichton-Vulcan were exported to Soviet Union but the importance of western market increased by time. The historical name Crichton-Vulcan was replaced by Wärtsilä Turku Shipyard in 1966.

Moving to Perno 
The old yard area at river Aura was surrounded by the growing city and when Tankmar Horn became manager of Wärtsilä in the early 1970s, he initiated building a completely new yard out of the urban area. Construction of Perno yard began in 1975 and operations were gradually moved from river Aura to the new premises. Wärtsilä's reputation as cruise ship builder grew and the proportion of freight ships decreased gradually. In 1987 Wärtsilä put together its shipbuilding operations with Valmet creating Wärtsilä Marine. Due to collapse of Soviet exports, errors in price calculations and other reasons, Wärtsilä Marine bankrupted in October 1989.

Foundation and Norwegian ownership 
The company was founded as Masa-Yards Turku New Shipyard in November 1989 to continue operations of the previously bankrupted Wärtsilä Marine. The founders were Helsinki shipyard manager Martin Saarikangas, state of Finland and companies of which ships were laying unfinished at Wärtsilä Marine yards. Both the state and the shipowners wanted to sell the shares as soon as the operations were restarted and subsequently the company was taken over by Norwegian Kværner in 1990. By 2002 the major owner of Kværner became another Norwegian company Aker which already owned the Finnish Rauma shipyard. In 2004 the shipbuilding activities were put under the same organisation Aker Yards. In 2008 Korean STX Corporation took over Aker Yards.

STX Finland 

The Korean owner renamed the European organisation STX Europe and its Finnish branch became STX Finland. Perno yard was specialised on large cruise ships and cruise ferries with a high degree of processing. Other branches were shipyards in Rauma and Helsinki and naval engineering company Aker Arctic.

STX fell into a financial crisis and at the end of 2012 asked for financial support from the Finnish government in order to receive a large cruise ship order from RCCL. The government rejected this, because the overall project financing was not on a plausible basis. STX decided to build the ship at its French shipyard in Saint-Nazaire, where the government was more generous. The loss of such a valuable order in a difficult economic situation made the future of Finnish shipbuilding uncertain. The Finnish government started a secret operation to find more stable operators for the shipyards in order to save the industry in the country. The Rauma shipyard was closed in 2013 and the ground was sold to town of Rauma; the yard is now operated by Rauma Marine Constructions. The sole owner of Helsinki shipyard became Russian USC, which earlier owned half of it. In 2014 the new operator for Turku yard became Meyer Werft under name Meyer Turku. At the beginning the state was the joint owner until Meyer Werft bought the rest of the shares.

List of ships built or on order

References

Bibliography

External links
Official website

Shipbuilding companies of Finland
Ships built in Turku
Shipyards of Finland
Manufacturing companies established in 1989
Finnish companies established in 1989